Cole Harbour may refer to:

Bodies of water
Cole Harbour (natural harbour) in Nova Scotia

Communities
Cole Harbour, Nova Scotia, a community in the Halifax Regional Municipality
Cole Harbour (Guysborough), Nova Scotia, a community in Guysborough, Nova Scotia
Cole Harbour 30, Nova Scotia, a Mi'kmaq reserve
Coleharbor, North Dakota

Electoral districts
Cole Harbour-Eastern Passage, a provincial electoral district in Nova Scotia
Dartmouth—Cole Harbour, a federal electoral district in Nova Scotia
Cole Harbour (electoral district), a former provincial electoral district in Nova Scotia
Dartmouth-Cole Harbour (provincial electoral district), which is no longer in existence

See also

 
 
 
 
 
 
 
 
 Harbor (disambiguation)
 Cole (disambiguation)
 Coral Harbour, Nunavut, Canada
 Coal Harbor (disambiguation)